Ersin Veli (born 2 April 1982) is a former Turkish footballer who played as a central defender. In 2009 he had his only experience outside Turkey playing in Romania for Liga I club Ceahlăul Piatra Neamț.

Honours
Yeni Malatyaspor
TFF Second League: 2014–15

References

1982 births
Living people
Turkish footballers
Association football defenders
TFF First League players
TFF Second League players
TFF Third League players
Liga I players
Anadolu Üsküdar 1908 footballers
Fethiyespor footballers
Darıca Gençlerbirliği footballers
Eyüpspor footballers
Gebzespor footballers
Diyarbakırspor footballers
Giresunspor footballers
CSM Ceahlăul Piatra Neamț players
Samsunspor footballers
Karşıyaka S.K. footballers
TKİ Tavşanlı Linyitspor footballers
Yeni Malatyaspor footballers
Turkish expatriate footballers
Expatriate footballers in Romania
Turkish expatriate sportspeople in Romania
People from Düzce